The 2009 S-Pulse season was S-Pulse's eighteenth season in existence and their seventeenth season in the J1 League. The club also competed in the Emperor's Cup and the J.League Cup. The team finished the season seventh in the league.

Competitions

Player statistics

Other pages
 J. League official site

Shimizu S-Pulse
Shimizu S-Pulse seasons